Computer-based mathematics education (CBME) is an approach to teaching mathematics that emphasizes the use of computers.

Computers in math education 
Computers are used in education in a number of ways, such as interactive tutorials, hypermedia, simulations and educational games. Tutorials are types of software that present information, check learning by question/answer method, judge responses, and provide feedback. Educational games are more like simulations and are used from the elementary to college level. E learning systems can deliver math lessons and exercises and manage homework assignments.

See also
ALEKS, a computer-based education system that includes mathematics among its curricula
Computer-Based Math, a project aimed at using computers for computational tasks and spending more classroom time on applications
Mathletics (educational software), a popular K-12 mathematics learning program from 3P Learning
Mathspace, a similar program for students aged 7-18, founded in Australia in 2010
Sokikom, a team-based math learning game

References

Mathematics education
Educational math software